Annie Dillard (born April 30, 1945) is an American author, best known for her narrative prose in both fiction and non-fiction. She has published works of poetry, essays, prose, and literary criticism, as well as two novels and one memoir. Her 1974 work Pilgrim at Tinker Creek won the 1975 Pulitzer Prize for General Nonfiction. From 1980, Dillard taught for 21 years in the English department of Wesleyan University, in Middletown, Connecticut.

Early life and An American Childhood
Annie Dillard was the eldest of three daughters. Early childhood details can be drawn from Annie Dillard's autobiography, An American Childhood (1987), about growing up in the 50s Point Breeze neighborhood of Pittsburgh in "a house full of comedians.".  The book focuses on "waking up" from a self-absorbed childhood, and becoming immersed in the present moment of the larger world.  She describes her mother as an energetic non-conformist. Her father taught her many useful subjects such as plumbing, economics, and the intricacies of the novel On the Road, though by the end of her adolescence she begins to realize neither of her parents is infallible.

In her autobiography, Dillard describes reading a wide variety of subjects including geology, natural history, entomology, epidemiology, and poetry, among others. Among the influential books from her youth were The Natural Way to Draw and Field Book of Ponds and Streams because they allowed her a way to interact with the present moment and a way of escape, respectively. Her days were filled with exploring, piano and dance classes, rock collecting, bug collecting, drawing, and reading books from the public library including natural history and military history such as World War II.

As a child, Dillard attended the Shadyside Presbyterian Church in Pittsburgh, though her parents did not attend. She spent four summers at the First Presbyterian Church (FPC) Camp in Ligonier, Pennsylvania. As an adolescent, she quit attending church because of "hypocrisy". When she told her minister of her decision, she was given four volumes of C. S. Lewis's broadcast talks, from which she appreciated that author's philosophy on suffering, but elsewhere found the topic inadequately addressed.

She attended Pittsburgh Public Schools until fifth grade, and then The Ellis School until college.

College and writing career
Dillard attended Hollins College (now Hollins University), in Roanoke, Virginia, where she studied literature and creative writing. She married her writing teacher, the poet R. H. W. Dillard, eight years her senior. Dillard stated: "In college I learned how to learn from other people. As far as I was concerned, writing in college didn't consist of what little Annie had to say, but what Wallace Stevens had to say. I didn't come to college to think my own thoughts, I came to learn what had been thought." In 1968 she earned an MA in English. Her thesis on Henry David Thoreau showed how Walden Pond functioned as "the central image and focal point for Thoreau's narrative movement between heaven and earth." Dillard spent the first few years after graduation oil painting, writing, and keeping a journal. Several of her poems and short stories were published, and during this time she also worked for Johnson's Anti-Poverty Program.

Dillard's works have been compared to those by Virginia Woolf, Gerard Manley Hopkins, Emily Dickinson, William Blake, and John Donne, and she cites Henry James, Thomas Hardy, Graham Greene, George Eliot, and Ernest Hemingway among her favorite authors.

Tickets for a Prayer Wheel
In her first book of poems, Tickets for a Prayer Wheel (1974), Dillard first articulated themes that she would later explore in other works of prose.

Pilgrim at Tinker Creek
Dillard's journals served as a source for Pilgrim at Tinker Creek (1974), a nonfiction narrative about the natural world near her home in Roanoke, Virginia. Although the book contains named chapters, it is not (as some critics assumed) a collection of essays. Early chapters were published in The Atlantic, Harpers, and Sports Illustrated. The book describes God by studying creation, leading one critic to call her "one of the foremost horror writers of the 20th Century." In The New York Times, Eudora Welty said the work was "admirable writing" that reveals "a sense of wonder so fearless and unbridled... [an] intensity of experience that she seems to live in order to declare," but "I honestly don't know what [Dillard] is talking about at... times."

The book won the 1975 Pulitzer Prize for General Non-Fiction. Dillard was 29.

Holy the Firm
One day, Dillard decided to begin a project in which she would write about whatever happened on Lummi Island within a three-day time period. When a plane crashed on the second day, Dillard began to contemplate the problem of pain and God's allowance of "natural evil to happen". Although Holy the Firm (1977) was only 66 pages long, it took her 14 months, writing full-time, to complete the manuscript. In The New York Times Book Review novelist Frederick Buechner called it "a rare and precious book." Some critics wondered whether Dillard was under the influence of hallucinogenic drugs while writing the book. Dillard replied that she was not.

Teaching a Stone to Talk
Teaching a Stone to Talk (1982) is a book of 14 short nonfiction narrative and travel essays. The essay "Life on the Rocks: The Galapagos" won the New York Women's Press Club award, and "Total Eclipse" was chosen for Best American Essays of the [20th] Century (2000). As Dillard herself notes, "'The Weasel is lots of fun; the much-botched church service is (I think) hilarious." Following the first hardcover edition of the book, the order of essays was changed. Initially "Living Like Weasels" was first, followed by "An Expedition to the Pole." "Total Eclipse" was found between "On a Hill Far Away" and "Lenses."

The essays in Teaching a Stone to Talk: 
"Total Eclipse" 
"An Expedition to the Pole"
"In the Jungle"
"Living Like Weasels"
"The Deer at Providencia"
"Teaching a Stone to Talk"
"On a Hill Far Away"
"Lenses"
"Life on the Rocks: The Galapagos"
"A Field of Silence"
"God in the Doorway"
"Mirages"
"Sojourner"
"Aces and Eights"

Living by Fiction
In Living by Fiction (1982), Dillard produced her "theory about why flattening of character and narrative cannot happen in literature as it did when the visual arts rejected deep space for the picture plane." She later said that, in the process of writing this book, she talked herself into writing an old-fashioned novel.

Encounters with Chinese Writers
Encounters with Chinese Writers (1984) is a work of journalism. One part takes place in China, where Dillard was a member of a delegation of six American writers and publishers, following the fall of the Gang of Four. In the second half, Dillard hosts a group of Chinese writers, whom she takes to Disneyland along with Allen Ginsberg. Dillard describes it as "hilarious."

The Writing Life
The Writing Life (1989) is a collection of short essays in which Dillard "discusses with clear eye and wry wit how, where and why she writes". The Boston Globe called it "a kind of spiritual Strunk & White, a small and brilliant guidebook to the landscape of a writer's task." The Chicago Tribune wrote that, "For nonwriters, it is a glimpse into the trials and satisfactions of a life spent with words. For writers, it is a warm, rambling conversation with a stimulating and extraordinarily talented colleague." The Detroit News called it "a spare volume...that has the power and force of a detonating bomb." According to a biography of Dillard written by her husband Robert D. Richardson and posted on her official website, Dillard "repudiates The Writing Life, except for the last chapter, the true story of stunt pilot Dave Rahm."

The Living
Dillard's first novel, The Living (1992), centers around the first European settlers of the Pacific Northwest coast. While writing the book, she never allowed herself to read works that postdated the year she was writing about, nor did she use anachronistic words.

Mornings Like This
Mornings Like This (1995) is a book dedicated to found poetry. Dillard took and arranged phrases from various old books, creating poems that are often ironic in tone. The poems are not related to the original books' themes. "A good trick should look hard and be easy," said Dillard. "These poems were a bad trick. They look easy and are really hard."

For the Time Being
For the Time Being (1999) is a work of narrative nonfiction. Its topics mirror the various chapters of the book and include "birth, sand, China, clouds, numbers, Israel, encounters, thinker, evil, and now." In her own words on this book, she writes, "I quit the Catholic Church and Christianity; I stay near Christianity and Hasidism."

The Maytrees
The Maytrees (2007) is Dillard's second novel. The story begins after World War II and tells of a lifelong love between a husband and wife who live in Provincetown, Cape Cod. It was a finalist for the PEN/Faulkner Award for Fiction in 2008.

The Abundance 
The Abundance, a collection of essays curated by the author, was published in 2017.

Awards
Dillard's books have been translated into at least 10 languages. Her 1975 Pulitzer-winning book, Pilgrim at Tinker Creek, made Random House's survey of the century's 100 best nonfiction books. The Los Angeles Times''' survey of the century's 100 best Western novels includes The Living. The century's 100 best spiritual books (ed. Philip Zaleski) also includes Pilgrim at Tinker Creek. The 100 best essays (ed. Joyce Carol Oates) includes "Total Eclipse," from Teaching a Stone to Talk. Two of Dillard's books have won Maurice-Edgar Cointreau Prizes for Best Translation in English. Pilgrim at Tinker Creek won in 1999 and For the Time Being in 2002. Both were translated by Sabine Porte.

In 2000, Dillard's For the Time Being received the PEN/Diamonstein-Spielvogel Award for the Art of the Essay.

To celebrate its city's centennial in 1984, the Boston Symphony commissioned Sir Michael Tippett to compose a symphony. He based part of its text on Pilgrim at Tinker Creek.

In 2005, artist Jenny Holzer used An American Childhood, along with three other books, in her light-based 'scrolling' artwork "For Pittsburgh", installed at the Carnegie Museum in Pittsburgh.

On September 10, 2015, Dillard was awarded a National Humanities Medal.

Personal life

Relationships

In 1965, Annie (who was then Annie Doak) married her creative writing professor, Richard Dillard. In 1975, they divorced amicably and she moved from Roanoke to Lummi Island near Bellingham, Washington. She taught at Western Washington University part-time as a writer-in-residence. She later married Gary Clevidence, an anthropology professor at WWU's Fairhaven College, and they have a child, Cody Rose. Dillard was married from 1988 until 2020 (his death) to historical biographer Robert D. Richardson, whom she met after sending him a fan letter about his book Henry Thoreau: A Life of the Mind.Teaching
In 1975, Dillard moved to the Pacific Northwest and taught for four years at Fairhaven College and Western Washington University. In 1980, she began what would become a 21-year teaching career in the English department of Wesleyan University in Middletown, Connecticut.

Religion
After college Dillard says she became "spiritually promiscuous." Her first prose book, Pilgrim at Tinker Creek, makes references not only to Christ and the Bible, but also to Islam, and Judaism, Buddhism, and Inuit spirituality. Dillard for a while converted to Roman Catholicism around 1988. This was described in detail in a New York Times overview of her work in 1992. 
In 1994 she won the Campion Award, given to a Catholic writer every year by the editors of America. In her 1999 book, For the Time Being, she describes her abandonment of Christianity, describing the supposed absurdity of some Christian doctrines, while stating she still stays near Christianity, and continuing to valorize Catholic writer Teilhard de Chardin. Her personal website lists her religion as "none."

Philanthropy
Sales of Dillard's paintings benefit Partners in Health, a Boston-based nonprofit international health organization founded by Dr. Paul Farmer. Dillard's art is available on her website.

Major works

 1974 Tickets for a Prayer Wheel 
 1974 Pilgrim at Tinker Creek 
 1977 Holy The Firm 
 1982 Living By Fiction 
 1982 Teaching a Stone To Talk 
 1984 Encounters with Chinese Writers 
 1987 An American Childhood 
 1989 The Writing Life 
 1992 The Living 
 1995 Mornings Like This: Found Poems 
 1999 For the Time Being 
 2007 The Maytrees 
 2016 The Abundance: Narrative Essays Old & New''

References

Further reading

External links 

 
 
 NPR: Tsunami Commentary: Dots In Blue Water (Audio)
 The Washington Post: In Conversation With Annie Dillard
 Wonder Woman – The Epiphanies of Annie Dillard (Literary essay)
Annie Dillard Papers. Yale Collection of American Literature, Beinecke Rare Book and Manuscript Library.

Living people
American memoirists
American nature writers
20th-century American novelists
21st-century American novelists
20th-century American women writers
21st-century American women writers
Pulitzer Prize for General Non-Fiction winners
Members of the American Academy of Arts and Letters
Writers from Pittsburgh
Hollins University alumni
Wesleyan University faculty
American women poets
American women novelists
American women memoirists
American women essayists
Women science writers
20th-century American poets
21st-century American poets
PEN/Diamonstein-Spielvogel Award winners
20th-century American essayists
21st-century American essayists
Former Roman Catholics
National Humanities Medal recipients
PEN/Faulkner Award for Fiction winners
American science writers
Novelists from Pennsylvania
Novelists from Connecticut
The Ellis School alumni
1945 births
American women academics